"Yuki no Shingun" is a Japanese gunka composed in 1895 by Imperial Japanese Army musician  who reflected his experience in the Battle of Weihaiwei during the First Sino-Japanese War. The song was banned in the Imperial Japanese Army during World War II and was used in the 1977 film Mount Hakkoda.

Background

During the Battle of Weihaiwei, the Imperial Japanese Army experienced heavy snow and low temperature, while being under-equipped with water, food and fuel. Nagai reflected in his song the hardship Japanese soldiers experienced and their discontentment about the war.  The song, which was popular at the time of its publication and is described by scholars to have an upbeat melody, was said to be favoured by Ōyama Iwao.  It was also taught and sung in Japanese schools during the late Meiji period.

Nagai's song was later widely referred to by soldiers during the Second Sino-Japanese War and the Pacific War. The discontentment about the war expressed in the song were viewed as antagonistic to Japanese militarism and prohibited by the Imperial Japanese Army, though the effectiveness of the order was in doubt.

Lyrics

In popular culture
The 1977 film Mount Hakkoda used "Yuki no Shingun" and associated this song with the Hakkōda Mountains incident.
The Japanese version of the 2005 video game Destroy All Humans!, released in 2007, referred to the first two lines of the song.
The 2012 anime Girls und Panzer shows Yukari Akiyama and Riko "Erwin" Matsumoto singing the song during a reconnaissance march through the snow, and the anime's sequel films Girls und Panzer der Film and Girls und Panzer das Finale use the melody as a leitmotif for the Imperial Japanese Army-themed Chi-Ha-Tan Academy.

References

Songs about weather
Songs about soldiers
1895 songs
Japanese-language songs
Japanese patriotic songs